A journalist is an individual that collects/gathers information in form of text, audio, or pictures, processes them into a news-worthy form, and disseminates it to the public. The act or process mainly done by the journalist is called journalism.

Roles
Journalists can be broadcast, print, advertising, and public relations personnel, and, depending on the form of journalism, the term journalist may also include various categories of individuals as per the roles they play in the process. This includes reporters, correspondents, citizen journalists, editors, editorial-writers, columnists, and visual journalists, such as photojournalists (journalists who use the medium of photography).

A reporter is a type of journalist who researches, writes and reports on information in order to present using sources. This may entail conducting interviews, information-gathering and/or writing articles. Reporters may split their time between working in a newsroom, or from home, and going out to witness events or interviewing people. Reporters may be assigned a specific beat or area of coverage.

Matthew C. Nisbet, who has written on science communication, has defined a "knowledge journalist" as a public intellectual who, like Walter Lippmann, Fareed Zakaria, Naomi Klein, Michael Pollan,  and Andrew Revkin, sees their role as researching complicated issues of fact or science which most laymen would not have the time or access to information to research themselves, then communicating an accurate and understandable version to the public as a teacher and policy advisor.In his best-known books, Public Opinion (1922) and The Phantom Public (1925), Lippmann argued that most individuals lacked the capacity, time, and motivation to follow and analyze news of the many complex policy questions that troubled society. Nor did they often directly experience most social problems, or have direct access to expert insights. These limitations were made worse by a news media that tended to over-simplify issues and to reinforce stereotypes, partisan viewpoints, and prejudices. As a consequence, Lippmann believed that the public needed journalists like himself who could serve as expert analysts, guiding "citizens to a deeper understanding of what was really important".

In 2018, the United States Department of Labor's Occupational Outlook Handbook reported that employment for the category, "reporters, correspondents and broadcast news analysts," will decline 9 percent between 2016 and 2026.

Journalists today
A worldwide sample of 27,500 journalists in 67 countries in 2012-2016 produced the following profile:
57 percent male; 
mean age of 38
 mean years of experience, 13
college degree, 56 percent; graduate degree, 29 percent
61 percent specialized in journalism/communications at college
62 percent identified as generalists and 23 percent as hard-news beat journalists
47 percent were members of a professional association
80 percent worked full-time
50 percent worked in print, 23 percent on television, 17 percent on radio, and 16 percent online.

Journalistic freedom
Journalists sometimes expose themselves to danger, particularly when reporting in areas of armed conflict or in states that do not respect the freedom of the press. Organizations such as the Committee to Protect Journalists and Reporters Without Borders publish reports on press freedom and advocate for journalistic freedom. As of November 2011, the Committee to Protect Journalists reports that 887 journalists have been killed worldwide since 1992 by murder (71%), crossfire or combat (17%), or on dangerous assignment (11%). The "ten deadliest countries" for journalists since 1992 have been Iraq (230 deaths), Philippines (109), Russia (77), Colombia (76), Mexico (69), Algeria (61), Pakistan (59), India (49), Somalia (45), Brazil (31) and Sri Lanka (30).

The Committee to Protect Journalists also reports that as of 1 December 2010, 145 journalists were jailed worldwide for journalistic activities. Current numbers are even higher. The ten countries with the largest number of currently-imprisoned journalists are Turkey (95), China (34), Iran (34), Eritrea (17), Burma (13), Uzbekistan (6), Vietnam (5), Cuba (4), Ethiopia (4), and Sudan (3).

Apart from physical harm, journalists are harmed psychologically. This applies especially to war reporters, but their editorial offices at home often do not know how to deal appropriately with the reporters they expose to danger. Hence, a systematic and sustainable way of psychological support for traumatized journalists is strongly needed. However, only little and fragmented support programs exist so far.

Journalist and source relationship 
The relationship between a professional journalist and a source can be rather complex, and a source can sometimes have an effect on an article written by the journalist. The article 'A Compromised Fourth Estate' uses Herbert Gans' metaphor to capture their relationship. He uses a dance metaphor, "The Tango," to illustrate the co-operative nature of their interactions inasmuch as "It takes two to tango". Herbert suggests that the source often leads, but journalists commonly object to this notion for two reasons:
 It signals source supremacy in news making.
 It offends journalists' professional culture, which emphasizes independence and editorial autonomy.

The dance metaphor goes on to state:

A relationship with sources that is too cozy is potentially compromising of journalists' integrity and risks becoming collusive. Journalists have typically favored a more robust, conflict model, based on a crucial assumption that if the media are to function as watchdogs of powerful economic and political interests, journalists must establish their independence of sources or risk the fourth estate being driven by the fifth estate of public relations.

The worst year on record for journalists 

According to Reporters Without Borders' annual report, 2018 was the worst year on record for deadly violence and abuse toward journalists; there was a 15 percent increase in such killings since 2017, with 80 killed, 348 imprisoned and 60 held hostage.

Yaser Murtaja was shot by an Israeli army sniper. Rubén Pat was gunned down outside a beach bar in Mexico. Mexico was described by Reporters Without Borders as "one of world's deadliest countries for the media"; 90% of attacks on journalists in the country reportedly go unsolved. Bulgarian Viktoria Marinova was beaten, raped and strangled. Saudi Arabian dissident Jamal Khashoggi was killed inside Saudi Arabia's consulate in Istanbul.

Gallery

See also 

 24-hour news cycle
 Broadcast journalism
 Electronic field production (EFP)
 Electronic news-gathering (ENG)
 Glossary of journalism
 List of ITV journalists and newsreaders
 List of journalists
 Local news
 News broadcasting
 News presenter
 Newsroom
 Outside broadcasting
 Student newspaper
 War correspondent

References

Bibliography
 Deuze, Mark. "What is journalism? Professional identity and ideology of journalists reconsidered." Journalism 6.4 (2005): 442-464 online.
 Hanitzsch, Thomas, et al. eds. Worlds of Journalism: Journalistic Cultures around the Globe (1979)   excerpt of the book also online review
 Hicks, Wynford, et al. Writing for journalists (Routledge, 2016) short textbook; excerpt.
 Keeble, Richard. Ethics for journalists (Routledge, 2008).
 Mellado, Claudia, et al. "Investigating the gap between newspaper journalists' role conceptions and role performance in nine European, Asian, and Latin American countries." International Journal of Press/Politics (2020): 1940161220910106 online.
 Patterson, Thomas E., and Wolfgang Donsbagh. "News decisions: Journalists as partisan actors." Political communication  13.4 (1996): 455–468. online
 Randall, David. The Universal Journalist. (Pluto Press, 2000). ; OCLC 43481682
 Shoemaker, Pamela J., Tim P. Vos, and Stephen D. Reese. "Journalists as gatekeepers." in The handbook of journalism studies 73 (2009) online .
 Stone, Melville Elijah.  Fifty Years a Journalist. New York: Doubleday, Page and Company (1921). 
 Wettstein, Martin, et al. "News media as gatekeepers, critics, and initiators of populist communication: How journalists in ten countries deal with the populist challenge." International Journal of Press/Politics 23.4 (2018): 476-495 online.

External links

Society of Professional Journalists

 

Broadcasting occupations
Journalism occupations
Mass media occupations
Television terminology